Hyloconis improvisella is a moth of the family Gracillariidae. It is known from the Russian Far East.

The larvae feed on Lespedeza bicolor. They probably mine the leaves of their host plant.

References

Lithocolletinae

Insects of Russia
Moths described in 1986
Taxa named by V.P. Ermolaev
Moths of Asia